Daniela Hantuchová was the two-time defending champion but retired against Nina Bratchikova in the second round.
Maria Kirilenko became the new champion after defeating Sabine Lisicki 5–7, 6–1, 7–6(7–1) in the final.

Seeds

Draw

Finals

Top half

Bottom half

Qualifying

Seeds

Qualifiers

Draw

First qualifier

Second qualifier

Third qualifier

Fourth qualifier

References 
 Main Draw
 Qualifying Draw

Singles
PTT Pattaya Open - Singles
 in women's tennis